The A234 is an A road between Crystal Palace and Beckenham in London, England.

It starts as Crystal Palace Park Road near the top of Sydenham Hill.  Running down on the North side of Crystal Palace Park it passes under two viaducts for the railway lines between London Bridge and East Croydon and Crystal Palace.  It then enters Penge as Penge High Street before crossing the A213. It then passes underneath Tramlink, before finishing at Beckenham town centre.

External links
SABRE Roads by Ten – A234

Roads in England
Streets in the London Borough of Bromley